The men's 200 metres event at the 2015 Asian Athletics Championships was held on the 6 and 7 of June.

Medalists

Results

Heats
First 4 in each heat (Q) and the next 4 fastest (q) qualified for the semifinals.

Wind:Heat 1: -0.9 m/s, Heat 2: -2.2 m/s, Heat 3: -0.1 m/s, Heat 4: -0.7 m/s, Heat 5: -1.5 m/s

Semifinals
First 2 in each semifinal (Q) and the next 2 fastest (q) qualified for the final.

Wind:Heat 1: -1.1 m/s, Heat 2: -0.7 m/s, Heat 3: -1.0 m/s

Final
Wind: +1.0 m/s

References

200
200 metres at the Asian Athletics Championships